In geometry, confocal means having the same foci: confocal conic sections.

 For an optical cavity consisting of two mirrors, confocal means that they share their foci. If they are identical mirrors, their radius of curvature, Rmirror, equals L, where L is the distance between the mirrors.
 In conic sections, it is said of two ellipses, two hyperbolas, or an ellipse and a hyperbola which share both foci with each other. If an ellipse and a hyperbola are confocal, they are perpendicular to each other.
 In optics, it means that one focus or image point of one lens is the same as one focus of the next lens.

See also
Confocal laser scanning microscopy
Confocal microscopy

Elementary geometry
Optics